Alessia Leolini (born 3 February 1997) is an Italian artistic gymnast.

Early life
Leolini was born in Montevarchi, Italy in 1997.

Gymnastics career

Junior

2010 - 2012 
Leolini competed at various national competitions in 2010 and 2011. She made her international debut at the 2011 City of Jesolo Trophy, in which Italy placed third in team finals. In November Leolini competed at the Top Gym Invitational in Belgium where she placed second in the all-around behind Evgeniya Shelgunova of Russia. She also won silver on uneven bars and floor exercise.

In 2012 Leolini competed at the European Championships where Italy won silver in the team final.

Senior

2013

Leolini became senior in 2013. She competed at the 2013 World Championships. She placed 22nd in vault qualifications and did not qualify to the final.

2014 - 2016
Leolini competed at the City of Jesolo Trophy where she placed second on vault behind MyKayla Skinner of the US. She also placed 22nd in the all-around.

In 2015 Leolini competed at the European Games where Italy placed fifth in the team final.

Competitive history

References

External links
 

1997 births
Living people
Gymnasts at the 2015 European Games
Italian female artistic gymnasts
Sportspeople from Arezzo
European Games competitors for Italy